Co-op Kobe, officially known as Consumer Co-operative Kobe, is a consumers' cooperative based in Kobe, Japan. It was founded in 1921 by Toyohiko Kagawa, and was later merged with Nada Consumer Co-operative. Now, with over 1.2 million members, it is the largest consumers' cooperative in the world.

External links
 http://www.coop-kobe.net/
 http://jccu.coop/eng/aboutus/history.php

Consumers' cooperatives
Cooperatives in Japan
Organizations based in Kobe
Organizations based in Hyōgo Prefecture